Guk In-suk (born 13 October 1965) is a South Korean rower. She competed in the women's coxed four event at the 1988 Summer Olympics.

Guk attended Kyonggi University. She represented South Korea in rowing at an international friendly competition in Japan in 1985. She won a silver medal in women's coxed four at the 1986 Asian Games with a time of 7:50.57. She competed at the 1990 Asian Games as well.

References

1965 births
Living people
Kyonggi University alumni
South Korean female rowers
Asian Games medalists in rowing
Rowers at the 1986 Asian Games
Rowers at the 1990 Asian Games
Medalists at the 1986 Asian Games
Medalists at the 1990 Asian Games
Asian Games silver medalists for South Korea
Asian Games bronze medalists for South Korea
Olympic rowers of South Korea
Rowers at the 1988 Summer Olympics
Place of birth missing (living people)
20th-century South Korean women
21st-century South Korean women